Eefje de Visser (born 8 February 1986) is a Dutch singer-songwriter. She won the Grote Prijs van Nederland, a national competition for musicians, in 2009. She released her first album, De Koek, in 2011, a breakthrough year in which she performed (accompanied by a four-man band called Most Unpleasant Men) at three major Dutch festivals: the Oerol Festival, Lowlands, and the Uitmarkt.

On 14 December 2015 Eefje de Visser released a new song, "Scheef", on YouTube. The album Nachtlicht followed the next year. In 2020 she released her fourth album Bitterzoet, followed by a European tour supporting Balthazar. She currently resides in Ghent.

Discography

Albums

References

External links

Dutch singer-songwriters
Living people
People from Leidschendam-Voorburg
1986 births
21st-century Dutch singers
21st-century Dutch women singers